The Women's Rugby League Conference was a rugby league for female teams in Britain that ran from 2008 to 2013.

The men's equivalent is the Rugby League Conference.

2011 structure

Central Division: Bradford Thunderbirds, Brighouse Ladies, Dudley Hill Diamonds, Keighley Cats, West Craven Warriors
North East Division: Featherstone Rovers, Hunslet Hawks, Peterlee Pumas, Leeds Akkies, Stanningley, Whinmoor
North West Division: Chorley Panthers, Leigh East, Leigh Miners Rangers, Mancunians RL, Wigan Ladies
South Division: Coventry Bears, Nottingham Outlaws, Royal Air Force, Royal Navy, The Army, West London Sharks
West Division: Crosfields, Halton, Macclesfield, Warrington, Widnes Moorfield

History

The Southern Conference League began as a 10-team pilot league for male rugby league teams in the Midlands and South of England in 1997. It changed its name to the Rugby League Conference in 1998 and expanded to cover the whole of Great Britain.

The first Women's Rugby League Conference began in 2008.

Competing teams by season

In 2009 the following teams played in the Conference:

National Division: Bradford Thunderbirds, Copeland Wildcats, Coventry Bears, Nottingham Outlaws, Wakefield Panthers, West London Sharks
North West Division: Chorley Panthers, Halton, Hillside Hawks, Macclesfield, Warrington Wolves
Yorkshire Division: Bradford Dudley Hill, Brighouse, Keighley Cats, Leeds Akkies, Stanningley

2010 structure:
East Division: Keighley Cats, Leeds Akkies, Guiseley, Stanningley, Whinmoor, York
South Division: Coventry Bears, Northampton Demons, Nottingham Outlaws, West London Sharks
West Division: Chorley, Warrington, Wigan

2011 structure:
Central Division: Bradford Thunderbirds, Brighouse Ladies, Dudley Hill Diamonds, Keighley Cats, West Craven Warriors
North East Division: Featherstone Rovers, Hunslet Hawks, Peterlee Pumas, Leeds Akkies, Stanningley, Whinmoor
North West Division: Chorley Panthers, Leigh East, Leigh Miners Rangers, Mancunians RL, Wigan Ladies
South Division: Coventry Bears, Nottingham Outlaws, Royal Air Force, Royal Navy, The Army, West London Sharks
West Division: Crosfields, Halton, Macclesfield, Warrington, Widnes Moorfield

Winners

2008
West London Sharks Ladies

2009
National Division: Bradford Thunderbirds
RLC Regional: Hillside Hawks 
North West Division: Hillside Hawks 
Yorkshire Division: Keighley Cats

2010
Women's RLC: Keighley Cats
Women's RLC Plate: Coventry Bears

2011
 Women's RLC South Division: Coventry Bears
 Women's RLC North East Division: Hunslet Hawks
 Women's RLC Central Division: Bradford Thunderbirds
 Women's RLC North West Division: Leigh East
 Women's RLC West Division: Halton
 Women's RLC: Warrington
 Women's RLC Plate: Leeds Akkies

See also

Women's rugby league
Rugby League Conference
RFL Women's Rugby League
Women's Rugby League World Cup
Women's Challenge Cup
Women's Super League

External links 

Rugby League Conference
Women's rugby league competitions in England
2008 establishments in the United Kingdom
Sports leagues established in 2008